Moberly Junior High School is a historic school building located at Moberly, Randolph County, Missouri. The main block was built in 1930, and is a two-story, "H"-shaped, brick building with simple Art Deco styling.  The rear auditorium wing was built in 1917 and was originally an addition to an older school that burned. The building closed in 1997. The auditorium and gymnasium wing was  demolished in August 2018.

It was listed on the National Register of Historic Places in 2008.

References

School buildings on the National Register of Historic Places in Missouri
Art Deco architecture in Missouri
School buildings completed in 1930
Buildings and structures in Randolph County, Missouri
National Register of Historic Places in Randolph County, Missouri
1930 establishments in Missouri